The Wrexham Deanery is a Roman Catholic deanery in the Diocese of Wrexham that covers several churches in Wrexham and Powys.

The dean is based at the Parish of St Mary the Virgin in Ruabon.

Churches 

 Wrexham Cathedral, Wrexham
 Holy Family, Coedpoeth - served from Wrexham Cathedral
 St Anne, Wrexham
 St Mary the Virgin (Church in Wales), Ruabon
 Holy Cross (Y Groes), Llangollen - served from Ruabon
 Sacred Heart, Chirk - served from Ruabon
 St Francis of Assisi, Llay
 Christ the King, Rossett - served from Llay
 God the Holy Ghost, Newtown
 Our Lady and St Richard Gwyn, Llanidloes - served from Newtown
 St Winefride, Welshpool
 St Garmon (Church in Wales), Llanfechain - served from Welshpool
 Our Lady and the Welsh Martyrs, Overton

Gallery

References

External links
 Diocese of Wrexham site
 Llay and Rossett Parish site
 God the Holy Spirit Parish site
 St Winefride Parish site

Roman Catholic Deaneries in the Diocese of Wrexham